The Hohhot Ring Expressway, designated as G5901 is an expressway in Inner Mongolia, Northern China orbiting the city of Hohhot.  This expressway is a branch of G6 Beijing–Lhasa Expressway.

Detailed itinerary

References

Expressways in Inner Mongolia
Chinese national-level expressways
Hohhot